As of 2020, the U.S. state of Missouri had the fourth highest rate of substance abuse in the United States. The National Survey on Drug Use and Health (NSDUH) surveyed that 7.7% of Missouri residents reported using illicit drugs. The national average of drug abuse is 8.82%. In addition, 2.99% of those people were reported using an illegal substance other than recreational marijuana. Whilst the national average for recreational cannabis use is 3.6%. Cannabis is the most abused drug in Missouri, followed by opioids, then methamphetamine. Missouri is commonly known for its high rates of drug abuse during the Bush and Obama administrations.

Legal measures against drug abuse
To counteract drug abuse in Missouri, SAMHSA gave two grants worth a total of 66 million dollars to the Missouri Department of Mental Health, to cover building costs of rehabilitation centers. In addition, The Department Of Mental Health launched a public education campaign to educate children about prescription drug addiction. SAMHSA also created a drug abuse hotline to help addicts get treatment. The United States government also created the “Keepin’ It REAL Program” as a replacement for the D.A.R.E. Program after it lost funding in 1998. In addition, the Missouri State Highway Patrol reported to have arrested a total of 530,596 people for drug related crimes from the years 2001–2014.

Cannabis usage 
As of November 6, 2018, medical cannabis has been legalized in Missouri. Recreational marijuana has not been legalized yet, but will be on ballots in the elections of 2022.

Before July 1, 2021, it was illegal to have both a Medical Card and a CCW simultaneously in Missouri. But after legislators passed a law, it is now legal to obtain both.

Methamphetamine usage 
As of January 1, 2017, it is illegal to possess more than 24 grams of methamphetamine. Though, this is only if the drugs were intended to be used  recreationally, and is still legally used to treat ADHD.

In 2019, Missouri was labeled "America's Meth Production Capital”, after a study carried out by rehabs.com found it to have the highest number of meth labs per capita.

Nicotine usage 
As of 2018, Missouri had the tenth highest rate of nicotine usage in the United States. Around 10% of Missourian youth smoke nicotine. If E-Cigarettes are included, then the rate of youth nicotine consumption goes up to 20%. As of July 5th, 2022, Juul vapes were banned by the FDA from several U.S. states. It is likely that this will spread to other states, including Missouri

On December 20, 2019, the Federal Food, Drug, and Cosmetic Act was updated. This changed the minimum legal age to possess nicotine from 18 to 21.

Use in sports 
The state of Missouri officially banned the use of steroids and all other kinds of performance-enhancing substances on February 27, 1991, after the nationwide ban with the signing of the Anabolic Steroids Control Act of 1990. It is considered cheating to use any kind of performance-enhancing drug in official sports. If found guilty, one can face up to a $1000 fine, and up to a 2-year prison sentence.

Prohibition 
Before Prohibition, Missouri was the second largest wine-producing state in the nation, behind Kansas. Prohibition caused Missouri's economy to take a hit, as large wineries like Stone Hill Winery were shut down during prohibition. vineyards were also uprooted, making it impossible to resume production in 1933, when alcohol bans were lifted.

Currently, there are no dry counties in the state of Missouri. In Missouri's constitution, dry counties were prohibited. Missouri is not as strong in the wine industry nowadays, as the West Coast is more commercially dominant in wine production.

See also 

 Drug policy of the United States
 Missouri wine
 Cannabis in Missouri

References 

Missouri
Substance abuse
Health in Missouri